Berosus peregrinus is a species of hydrophilid beetles from Canada, the United States and Cuba.

References

Hydrophilinae
Beetles described in 1797